The White Pass Ski Area is a ski area in the Pacific Northwest of the United States, in the Cascade Range at White Pass in the state of Washington.

Alpine skiing 
Located on the south side of the east-west highway, the slopes primarily face north.

The mountain has six chairlifts: two high speed quads, a fixed-grip quad, a triple, and two doubles. It also includes two surface lifts: a platter lift and a magic carpet for beginning skiers. There is a terrain park located on Rib Eye off the Basin Quad that regularly features rail jams, slopestyle, and other obstacles.

Cross-country skiing 
The Nordic Center provides access to a variety of groomed, double-tracked cross-country ski, trails in the Wenatchee and Gifford Pinchot National Forests.

Base facilities 
The day lodge has rental skis and boards, food, lockers, and a bar. Across the highway to the north, the White Pass Village Inn offers overnight accommodations.

History 
White Pass Ski Area opened in January of 1953. The initial area only consisted of the Poma Face hill serviced by a number of Rope tows.

Shortly after, the ski area built a Poma surface lift that ran from roughly in front of the present day lodge's location to the top of the Poma Face.

In 1956, White Pass expanded to the summit of Pigtail Peak with its very first chairlift. Dubbed Pigtail I, the two-person lift was created by the Riblet Tramway Company of Spokane, Washington. The resort cut two long runs from the summit, which they named Holiday and Cascade.

White Pass added its second double chairlift, Pigtail II, in the fall of 1958. Also built by Riblet, it ran in parallel with the original chair. This second chair had nearly 30% greater capacity (900 vs. 700/hr), with a more robust cable and gearbox. It also had 50% more lift towers, which were greater in height in anticipation of high snowfall. The installed cost of the second chair exceeded $200,000. The resort also widened Cascade and cut out two additional runs from the summit: Mach V and Paradise. The area started full-week operations for the 1958–59 season, with daily adult lift tickets priced at $3.50.

In 1964, the area added a new Riblet double chairlift to the beginner area. Chair 3 ran from the highway on the east side of the resort to a flat area about a hundred yards below the base of Cascade Cliff. 

Former World Cup racing twins Phil and Steve Mahre grew up at White Pass, where their father Dave "Spike" Mahre was the mountain manager. The twin brothers and their seven siblings lived with their parents in a house near the base of the lifts.

In 1984, the ski area installed Chair 4, another double built by Riblet. This lift ran from roughly halfway down Paradise to the summit of Pigtail Peak. Additionally, the resort cut out three new runs around Paradise that ended at the new lift.

Looking to increase capacity at the base area, White Pass installed a high-speed detachable lift that ran from the highway to the summit in 1994. Built by Doppelmayr, the Great White Express had nearly double the capacity of the two Pigtail lifts combined. The Poma surface lift and Pigtail I were removed to make room for Great White, though some of the Poma's towers were left on the hill as lighting for night skiing.

In 2000, White Pass overhauled the beginner area of the mountain. The last remaining rope tow was replaced with a Doppelmayr platterpull. Chair 3 was removed and a new Garaventa triple lift, following a different route, was installed. Beginning in a newly cut-out area to the east of the area, the Far East lift ended at the top of the Poma Face.

The expansion in the Paradise Basin opened in the 2010–11 season and added  of terrain and two new Doppelmayr chairlifts. The Basin Quad is a fixed-grip quad and the Couloir Express is the area's second high-speed detachable quad. The resort also constructed a new lodge between the new chairlifts.

In December 2021, the ski area was sold by White Pass Co. Inc. to a group of five Yakima-area businesspeople. In 2022, the new ownership group introduced an expanded beginners' area, more Nordic trails, and a ski patrol building. Future expansion is contingent on approval from the U.S. Forest Service.

Lifts

Pigtail II is one of the oldest still-operating chairlifts in North America. As of 2019, it is the second-oldest chairlift still in operation in Washington state (beaten only by Mount Spokane’s Chair 1).

References

External links
  - Ski White Pass.com
 Ski Map.org – vintage trail maps – White Pass ski area
 WSDOT.wa.gov - White Pass road conditions & webcam

Buildings and structures in Lewis County, Washington
Ski areas and resorts in Washington (state)
Buildings and structures in Yakima County, Washington
Tourist attractions in Yakima County, Washington
Tourist attractions in Lewis County, Washington
Gifford Pinchot National Forest
1953 establishments in Washington (state)